Nitra District is a district in the Nitra Region of western Slovakia. It is the second most populated of Slovakia's 79 districts, after Prešov District. Before 1996 the present-day district belonged to the West-Slovak region (Západoslovenský kraj). It is named after the city of Nitra, its main economy and cultural center.

Municipalities

Source

References 

Districts of Slovakia
Geography of Nitra Region